Potosi Mine may refer to:
 Cerro Rico, near Potosí, Bolivia, famous for providing vast quantities of silver for Spain during the period of the New World Spanish Empire
 Potosi Mining District in southern Nevada, U.S., named after Potosí, Bolivia
 San Luis Potosí, a Mexican state, well known for its gold and silver mines, also named after Potosí, Bolivia

See also 
 Potosi (disambiguation)